The FIL European Luge Championships 1956 took place in Imst, Austria under the auspices of the Fédération Internationale de Bobsleigh et de Tobogganing (FIBT - International Bobsleigh and Tobogganing Federation in ) under their "Section de Luge". It would be the last championship under the FIBT until formation of the International Luge Federation (FIL) the following year.

Men's singles

Women's singles

Lieber ends Isser's European championship reign at this event.

Men's doubles

Medal table

References
Men's doubles European champions
Men's singles European champions
Women's singles European champions

FIL European Luge Championships
1956 in luge
Luge in Austria
1956 in Austrian sport